A. Y. B. I. Siddiqi (1944/1945 – 18 July 2021), also known as Burhan Siddiqi, was a  Bangladeshi diplomat and police officer who served as the 16th Inspector General of Police of Bangladesh Police during 1998–2000. He also played active roles in diplomatic and UN missions, having served as the Chief Liaison Officer for UNTAG in Namibia (1989–1990) and the Acting High Commissioner of Bangladesh.

Early life
Siddiqi grew up in Chittagong and moved to Lahore after completing his college studies.

Career
Siddiqi served as the secretary of the Ministry of Water Resources and the Ministry of Local Government. His third contact of the Local Government Secretary position expired on 31 December 2003. He retired from the government service in 2004. He then served as SME and consultant for multiple international water research, law and order and development projects.

In 2006, Siddiqi served as the National Project Co-ordinator.

Personal life
Siddiqi was married to Rehana Siddiqi since 1973. Together they had a son Lutfey Siddiqi, a managing director of United Bank of Switzerland and a daughter Husna Siddiqi who is an information protection professional in London, UK.

Siddiqi was diagnosed with cancer and was undergoing treatment at United Hospital in Dhaka  until his death on 18 July 2021.

References 

1940s births
2021 deaths
People from Chittagong
Bangladeshi diplomats
Inspectors General of Police (Bangladesh)
Place of birth missing
Date of birth missing